"Go with the Flow" is a song by Queens of the Stone Age from the album Songs for the Deaf, released as a single in 2003. At the 46th Annual Grammy Awards, the song was nominated for Best Hard Rock Performance.

Music video 

The music video for the song was filmed in England by Shynola. At the 2003 MTV Video Music Awards, it won Best Special Effects and was nominated for Best Art Direction and Breakthrough Video. The video—rendered in black, white, and red—features the band performing at the back of a Chevrolet pickup truck driving through a desert highway. The video also has sexual themes such as a metaphor of two cars colliding with each other, symbolizing intercourse, and an image of a bident (like the one on the cover of the album) showing some erotic attributes.

Track listings 

UK CD 1
"Go with the Flow" (album version)
"No One Knows" (UNKLE reconstruction remix radio edit)
"Hangin' Tree" (live at the Melkweg in Amsterdam on June 24, 2002)
"Go with the Flow" (CD-ROM video)

UK CD 2
"Go with the Flow" (album version)
"Regular John" (live; Melkweg in Amsterdam on 24 June 2002)
"Do It Again" (live; Melkweg in Amsterdam on 24 June 2002)

Australian special edition
"Go with the Flow" (album version)
"Avon" (live; The Mean Fiddler, London, on June 25, 2002)
"No One Knows" (Lavelle remix radio edit version)
"No One Knows" (CD-ROM video)

Dutch edition
"Go with the Flow" (album version)
"Avon" (live; The Mean Fiddler on June 25, 2002)
"No One Knows" (UNKLE Reconstruction radio edit)
"No One Knows" (CD-ROM video)

UK 12"
"Go with the Flow" (album version)
"No One Knows" (UNKLE reconstruction vocal version)
The 12" is pressed on clear vinyl.

Charts

Certifications

References

External links 

2003 singles
Animated music videos
Queens of the Stone Age songs
Songs written by Josh Homme
Songs written by Nick Oliveri
Song recordings produced by Eric Valentine